Silandhi  is a 2008 Tamil-language erotic thriller film.
Directed by debutant Aathiraj. The movie stars Munna and Monica in lead roles and Riyaz Khan in supporting role. The movie was later dubbed in Telugu as Erra Gulabi and in Hindi as Jaal - The Net. The director remade the movie in Kannada as Ranatantra in 2014 starring Vijay Raghavendra & Haripriya in lead roles. The movie is loosely based on the English movie I Know What You Did Last Summer.

Synopsis 
This movie is about two newly wed couple Mahesh (Munna) and Monika (Monica). They went to a lonely villa for their post-marriage honeymoon. The film had lot of Gilma scenes. In this villa some unnatural things happen.

Plot 
The story begins with a pretty girl (Monica) who is on the run with fear that death is looming over her and a young man (Munna) saves her from the trouble. Slowly, he starts building confidence in her and in this process both of them begin getting close to each other. Love happens and they get married, time for honeymoon and they set off to a remote bungalow in Pondicherry for their special moments. But things take a twist there since Monica senses that she is being followed by someone and from then on starts a trail of terror and fear that makes her life miserable. That is the time truth comes out that sometime back her three friends who earn a lot of money get used to an extravagant lifestyle and lose their humanity with pride and arrogance. In this process, they come across an innocent LIC policy agent (Chandru) who is ragged to the core by these three friends. In this confusion, the agent is injured and he dies due to the injuries. Monica who is with the gang does not involve in the ghastly happening but then helps them clear the dead body. Soon, each one of them starts dying and it now appears that Chandru is still alive and is out for Monica's blood.

Cast 

 Munna as Mahesh
Monica as Monika
Riyaz Khan as Police Officer 
Chandru 
 Saranya
 Krishna
Nellai Siva
Ganesh Babu
Jagan

References

External links 

2008 films
2000s Tamil-language films
2008 directorial debut films
Tamil films remade in other languages